My Kind of Livin' is the third studio album by American country music artist Craig Morgan. His highest-selling album to date, it has been certified Gold in the United States by the Recording Industry Association of America (RIAA).

The album produced three chart singles on the Billboard Hot Country Songs charts. The first of these, "That's What I Love About Sunday", became Morgan's only number one hit, and it was the top country music single of 2005 according to Billboard Year-End. "Redneck Yacht Club" peaked at number 2 on the country charts, while "I Got You" (which Morgan had originally intended for Keith Urban to record) was a number 12 hit.

Reception
Chris Willman of Entertainment Weekly gave the album a B rating and wrote, "Morgan's is an idealized Kind of Americana, to be sure. But at least he provides enough writerly detail to avoid setting off smarm alarms." Ralph Novak of People Magazine gave the album three and a half stars calling it "one terrific, old-fashioned country CD."

Track listing

Personnel
 Eddie Bayers – drums
 Jim "Moose" Brown – piano, keyboards
 John Conlee – vocals on "Blame Me"
 J. T. Corenflos – electric guitar
 Larry Franklin – fiddle
 Kevin "Swine" Grantt – bass guitar
 Rob Hajacos – fiddle
 Lona Heins – background vocals
 Mike Johnson – steel guitar, Dobro, Pedabro
 Jeff King – electric guitar
 Craig Morgan – lead vocals, background vocals
 Phil O'Donnell – acoustic guitar, electric guitar, background vocals
 Brad Paisley – electric guitar and vocals on "Blame Me"
 Bryan Sutton – acoustic guitar, banjo, mandolin
 Russell Terrell – background vocals

Chart performance
The album sold 22,000 units during its first week.

Weekly charts

Year-end charts

Singles

Certifications

References

External links
[ Allmusic Entry]

2005 albums
BBR Music Group albums
Craig Morgan albums